Dancing Days is an album by Chris Leslie, released in 2004.

Compared to Chris Leslie's earlier album The Flow, this is much more of a recognisable instrumental folk-rock effort. Occasionally Chris drifts off into a reverie that sounds like a monastery in Tibet, but this is less obvious than before. He gives a sprightly performance of many morris dance tunes, then adds the oriental effects as a variation at the end of some tracks, punctuated by finger cymbals.

Track listing 
 "Flowers of Edinburgh/ Old Tom of Oxford" (Traditional)
 "Laudnum Bunches (Headington)/ Orange In Bloom (Sherbourne)/ Banks of the Dee (Longborough)" (Traditional / Traditional/ Traditional)
 "Bower Processional (Lichfield)" (Traditional)
 "Princess Royal (Adderbury)/ Speed The Plough (Bampton)" (Traditional)
 "Old Marlborough (Fieldtown)" (Traditional)
 "The Dancer (song)" (Chris Leslie)
 "Jockey to the Fair (Adderbury)/ Double Jig (Bampton)" (Traditional/ Traditional)
 "Lumps of Plum Pudding (Bledington)/ Bean Setting (Headington)/ Bobbing a Joe (Wheatley)" (Traditional/ Traditional/ Traditional)
 "Sweet Jenny Jones (Adderbury) / Brighton Camp (Adderbury)/ Beaux of London City (Adderbury/ Badby)" (Traditional)
 "Stourton Wake and Jig (Adderbury)" (Traditional)
 "Haste to the Wedding (Adderbury) / Bluebells of Scotland (Adderbury) / Shepherd's Away (Adderbury)" (Traditional/ Traditional/ Traditional)
 "Bumpus O' Stretton (Ilmington)" (Traditional)
 "Janet Blunt Poem" (song) (words: Janet Blunt; tune: "Jamaica")
 "Morning Star (Bledington)/ Getting Upstairs (Headington)/ Wheatley Processional (Wheatley)" (Traditional/ Traditional/ Traditional)
 "A Secret" (medley *) (Traditional)

(* uncredited medley: Shepherd's Hey/ Bluebells of Scotland/ Brighton Camp/ sound of church bells/ Happy the Man (song))

Personnel 
 Chris Leslie - violins, percussion, bouzouki, mandolin, native American flute, kalimba, tingshaws, Tibetan singing bowls
 Simon Nicol - acoustic guitar
 Dave Pegg - bass
 Gerry Conway - percussion, congas
 Mat Green - violin
 Ric Sanders - violin
 Mikey Radford - dance
 Ashley Hutchings - bass

References

2004 albums
Chris Leslie (folk musician) albums